DXGL-TV (Channel 13) is a television station of PEC Broadcasting Corporation in Butuan and was formerly affiliated with ABC (now TV5 and formerly 5) from 1994 until 2015. Its studios and transmitters are located at PECBC Complex, Brgy Imadejas, Butuan.

See also
List of television and radio stations owned by TV5 Network
TV5 (Philippine TV network) (TV5)

References

Television channels and stations established in 1994
TV5 (Philippine TV network) stations
Television stations in Butuan
1994 establishments in the Philippines